Harry Hunter  Wendelstedt III (born June 22, 1971) is an American baseball umpire who has worked in the National League in 1998–1999 and throughout both major leagues since 2000. His father Harry Hunter Wendelstedt, Jr. was an NL umpire from 1966 to 1998. Hunter Wendelstedt goes by his middle name to avoid confusion with his father.

Umpiring career
Wendelstedt has worked one All-Star Game (2011), two Wild Card Game/Series (2015, 2022), four Division Series (2003, 2010, 2013, 2014), four League Championship Series (2006, 2015, 2017, 2018), and one World Series (2014).  He also officiated in the 2009 World Baseball Classic.

As his career began just as his father was retiring, Hunter Wendelstedt wears the same number as his father did, 21. The Wendelstedts are the only father-son pair to have umpired a Major League game together, an event that occurred over several series in 1998. Wendelstedt was the home plate umpire when Bartolo Colon hit his first career home run in San Diego.

Interaction with Ron Gardenhire
On October 7, 2010, Wendelstedt ejected Minnesota Twins manager Ron Gardenhire from Game 2 of the American League Division Series after Gardenhire argued a pitch which appeared to be strike three to Lance Berkman. Wendelstedt ruled it a ball, and on the next pitch Berkman hit a double scoring a run and putting the Yankees up, 3–2 (they would ultimately win, 5–2). It was at least the fourth time Wendelstedt has ejected Gardenhire. In 2005, Gardenhire was suspended one game and fined after delivering a profanity-laced rant about Wendelstedt, and in 2009, Wendelstedt suggested that Gardenhire should attend his umpiring school to "learn what a balk is," after ejecting Gardenhire for arguing a non-balk call. This contentious history fueled questions about the appropriateness of Major League Baseball putting Wendelstedt on a postseason series involving Gardenhire, as there is precedent in baseball for avoiding such confrontations, most notably the American League removing umpire Ron Luciano from games involving the Baltimore Orioles due to a long history of bad blood between the umpire and Orioles manager Earl Weaver.

On August 22, 2011, Wendelstedt ejected Twins third baseman Danny Valencia for disputing balls and strikes. Gardenhire came out to argue and his ejection followed. Afterward, Gardenhire said that he and Wendelstedt had actually gotten along well. Gardenhire stated that what had happened was his fault, not Wendelstedt's.

Personal life
Hunter attended Loyola University New Orleans for two years, where he was a member of Alpha Delta Gamma fraternity.

After the death of his father, Hunter took over operations of the Wendelstedt Umpire School in Florida and is involved with the YMCA Ormond Beach and YMCA Edgewater Charity Golf Tournaments.

See also

 List of Major League Baseball umpires

References

External links
 Major league profile
 Interview with Hunter Wendelstedt at Umpire-Empire
 Retrosheet
 Wendelstedt Umpire School

1971 births
Living people
Sportspeople from Atlanta
Sportspeople from New Orleans
Major League Baseball umpires
Loyola University New Orleans alumni